Marlington Local Schools is a school district located in Stark County, Ohio, United States.

There are five schools in the Marlington district: Washington Elementary School, Marlboro Elementary School, Lexington Elementary School, Marlington Middle School, and Marlington High School.
They have many sports teams such as football, basketball and wrestling. They have the Little Dukes for elementary students and Dukes for MMS (Marlington Middle School) and MHS (Marlington High School. Their Jersey is orange, black and white resembling Marlington colors. They have great teachers and staff. Some of their schools got into the hall of fame for schools.

External links
 Official Site

School districts in Stark County, Ohio